Twistwings are two species of Tyrant flycatchers from the genus Cnipodectes. They are restricted to northern and western South America and southern Central America. The genus was monotypic until a new species, Cnipodectes superrufus, was described from Peru and Bolivia in 2007. Their common name refers to the modified primaries. The genus contains two species.

Species

References

Cnipodectes
Taxa named by Philip Sclater
Taxa named by Osbert Salvin
Taxonomy articles created by Polbot